Brian Gordon Lee (born May 14, 1971 in Cheltenham, England) is the head coach of the Rice Owls women's soccer team.

Coaching career

Furman
Lee was head coach for 11 seasons at Furman, where he accumulated a 144–80–10 overall record, including a 76–16–3 mark in the Southern Conference. Lee was the Southern Conference Coach of the Year five times and was named the NSCAA and SoccerBuzz Southeast Region Coach of the Year in 1999, the same year he was selected as a finalist for NSCAA National Coach of the Year honors.

LSU
Lee was head women's soccer coach at LSU from 2005 to 2018. At LSU, Lee had an overall record of 143–100–45 and an SEC record of 65–68–27. Lee coached LSU to six NCAA Tournament appearances and four SEC West Division titles. He coached 46 players that earned All-SEC honors and nine All-Americans at LSU.

Rice
On March 29, 2019, Lee was named Rice Owls women's soccer head coach.

Playing career
A successful athlete in his own right, Lee played for the Furman soccer team from 1989–92 where he was part of three Southern Conference titles and was selected as a team captain and the Most Valuable Player. He also led his team to three Southern Conference championships and its first ever NCAA appearance, and a berth in the Sweet 16 in 1991.  Lee also led Gaither HS to the 1989 Florida State HS Final.

References

External links
LSU Tigers biography page 
Rice Owls biography page

LSU Tigers women's soccer coaches
American soccer coaches
Furman Paladins men's soccer players
Living people
1971 births
Sportspeople from Cheltenham
Furman Paladins women's soccer coaches
American women's soccer coaches
Association footballers not categorized by position
Association football players not categorized by nationality